Miguel Ángel Mostto Fernández-Prada, or Miguel Mostto (born 11 November 1977) is a Peruvian former professional footballer who played as a striker.

Club career
Mostto was born in Ica, Peru. He was signed by Barnsley on a two-year deal from Cienciano for a fee thought to be in the region of £350,000 to £400,000, the largest transfer fee paid by Barnsley since signing Neil Shipperley in 1999. He scored his first goal for Barnsley in a friendly with Barnsley winning 3–1 win over Buxton. His first league goal came in a 1–1 home draw against Burnley.

On 12 February 2008, Mostto left for his homeland to join up with former club Coronel Bolognesi on loan, but returned to Oakwell in time for the start of the 2008–09 Football League Championship season.

Mostto left Barnsley in October to return home to tend to his ill son. Reds boss Simon Davey granted the Peruvian indefinite leave to be with him.

Mostto bagged his second goal in Barnsley colours in the 2–1 win over Watford with a neat finish which would tie the game at 1–1 before Stephen Foster's winner. He then left Barnsley to return to Peru with Total Chalaco on 7 January 2009 for an undisclosed fee.

International career
Mostto was called up to the provisional Peru national team squad for Copa América 2007, but he was forced to pull out of the squad due to his transfer to Barnsley.

Honours
Cienciano
 Recopa Sudamericana: 2004
 Torneo Apertura: 2005
 Torneo Clausura:  2006

References

External links

Miguel Mostto profile at barnsleyfc.co.uk

1977 births
Living people
People from Ica, Peru
Peruvian footballers
Association football forwards
Peru international footballers
Peruvian Primera División players
English Football League players
Club Universitario de Deportes footballers
Cienciano footballers
Barnsley F.C. players
Coronel Bolognesi footballers
Total Chalaco footballers
Sport Huancayo footballers
Club Alianza Lima footballers
Peruvian expatriate footballers
Peruvian expatriate sportspeople in England
Expatriate footballers in England